Grevillea heliosperma, commonly known as rock grevillea, is a shrub native to northern Australia, generally growing around  tall, rarely to . It has red flowers.

Description
The rough bark is grey to black. The compound flower heads, known as inflorescences, appear from May or June to September, and are borne terminally.

Grevillea heliosperma resembles G. decurrens, which has pink flowers and is found in more gravelly soils. The two are closely related and have been considered conspecific, and there are populations with some intermediate characteristics.

Taxonomy and naming
Grevillea heliosperma was described in 1810 by Robert Brown in Transactions of the Linnean Society of London from material collected near the northern coastline of Australia. Its species name is derived from helios "sun" and sperma "seed" and relates to the shape of the seed surrounded by a winglike membrane.

A local name from the indigenous people of Groote Eylandt in their Enindilyakwa language is yinumamurarra.

Distribution and habitat
Rock grevillea grows in open forest or woodland, often in rocky habitats and sometimes on the edge of vine forest. It is found in the northern tropics of Australia, in the northern and central Kimberley regions of Western Australia, on the Barkly Tableland and Top End including off-shore islands of the Northern Territory, and the western gulf of north Queensland.

Uses and cultivation
When grown on its own roots, Grevillea heliosperma prefers a slightly acid soil and climate with predominantly summer rainfall.

Grevillea heliosperma has been successfully grafted onto Grevillea robusta. Local indigenous people ate the seeds raw and drank the nectar. Crushed leaves and bark could be made into a mixture to wash sores with.

References

heliosperma
Flora of the Northern Territory
Flora of Western Australia
Flora of Queensland
Proteales of Australia
Plants described in 1810
Taxa named by Robert Brown (botanist, born 1773)